Illicit may refer to:

 Illicit antiquities
 Illicit cigarette trade
 Illicit drug trade
 Illicit drug use
 Illicit Drug Anti-Proliferation Act
 Illicit financial flows
 Illicit major
 Illicit minor
 Illicit trade
 Illicit work
 Illicit Streetwear clothing company
 Illicit (Dance music group)
 Illicit (film), a 1931 film starring Barbara Stanwyck
 Illicit (album), a 1992 album by Tribal Tech

See also
Valid but illicit